Sphaerolobium gracile is a species of flowering plant in the family Fabaceae and is endemic to the south-west of Western Australia.

It was first formally described in 1864 by George Bentham in Flora Australiensis from specimens collected north of the Murchison River by Augustus Oldfield. The specific epithet (gracile) means "thin" or "slender".

Sphaerolobium gracile grows in sand in the Avon Wheatbelt, Geraldton Sandplains and Swan Coastal Plain bioregions of south-western Western Australia and is listed as "not threatened" by the Government of Western Australia Department of Biodiversity, Conservation and Attractions.

References

gracile
Eudicots of Western Australia
Plants described in 1864
Taxa named by George Bentham